This is a list of electricity-generating power stations in the U.S. state of Delaware, sorted by type and name.  In 2019, Delaware had a total summer capacity of 3,372 MW through all of its power plants, and a net generation of 5,259 GWh.  The corresponding electrical energy generation mix in 2021 was 86% natural gas, 6.8% coal, 1.7% biomass, 5.0% solar, 0.4% petroleum, and 0.1% wind.  Distributed small-scale solar, including customer-owned photovoltaic panels, delivered an additional net 124 GWh to the state's electricity grid.  This compares as more than twice the amount generated by Delaware's utility-scale solar facilities.

Fossil-fuel power stations
Data from the U.S. Energy Information Administration serves as a general reference.

Coal

 Total Net Summer Capacity

Petroleum

 Total Net Summer Capacity

Natural gas

 Total Net Summer Capacity
 Half of generating capacity at the Delaware City Oil Refinery is allocated to other petroleum gases.

Renewable power stations
Data from the U.S. Energy Information Administration serves as a general reference.

Biomass

 Total Net Summer Capacity

Geothermal
There were no utility-scale Geothermal facilities in the state of Delaware in 2019.

Hydroelectric

There were no utility-scale Hydroelectric facilities in the state of Delaware in 2019.

Solar photovoltaic

Wind

Nuclear power stations
There are no utility-scale Nuclear facilities in the state of Delaware.

Storage power stations

Battery Storage
There are no utility-scale Battery Storage facilities in the state of Delaware.

Pumped Storage
There are no utility-scale Pumped Storage facilities in the state of Delaware.

See also 
 List of power stations in the United States

References

Delaware
 
Lists of buildings and structures in Delaware
Energy in Delaware